Expolink Europe Ltd (branded as Expolink) was a British company founded in 1995 to provide independent whistleblower services.

Expolink worked with organisations all over the world to implement solutions for governance, risk management and compliance, with a strong presence in the United Kingdom and mainland Europe.

On 3 June 2019, Expolink announced via its website that it had been acquired by NAVEX Global. The business was fully incorporated into NAVEX Global and made defunct as of 31 December 2021.

History 
Expolink was founded in 1995 by local business owners David and Jackie Crook. Its first offices were in Castle Coombe, Wiltshire but soon moved to a business park within Chippenham, Wiltshire.

The whistleblowing hotline service was created after the owners were alerted to an alleged instance of sexual harassment against one of their employees at a client's premises. Many of the company's first clients were local government authorities and PLCs.

At the time it was founded, Expolink was the first outsourced whistleblowing service provider in Europe.

Confidential reporting services 
Expolink's manned telephone hotline service was launched in 1995, becoming a 24/7 service in 2001. A web reporting platform was introduced later that decade, followed by online case delivery in 2014. A mobile app reporting channel was launched in March 2017.

Services 
Expolink provided confidential reporting for users predominantly through its manned hotline facility and online platforms.

It also offered enterprise software to support the management and investigation of whistleblowing reports.

Benchmarking Data 
Expolink published a Benchmarking Report annually, which summarised data from the thousands of whistleblowing reports it processed each year.

In 2018 it revealed that whistleblowing reports relating to workplace sexual harassment and abuse had risen 89%, linking the trend to recent media revelations and the impact of the #MeToo movement.

The company's 2019 Report highlighted a 57% increase in workplace whistleblowing rates between 2016 and 2018.

Clients 
As of 2019, Expolink worked with more than 750 organisations globally, with the majority headquartered in the UK and Europe.

Its clients included L’Oréal, BAE Systems and the BBC. Expolink also worked with eight of the UK's top 10 retail banks and around one-third of companies listed on the FTSE 350 Index.

References 

Whistleblower support organizations
British companies established in 1995
Companies based in Wiltshire